Daniel R. Russel (born December 12, 1953) is an American diplomat who served as the Assistant Secretary of State for East Asian and Pacific Affairs from 2013 to 2017. Prior to his appointment as Assistant Secretary, Russel was Special Assistant to the President and National Security Staff Senior Director for Asian Affairs. While working at the White House, he was a major figure in the Obama administration's "pivot towards Asia" strategy.

Russel is currently a Diplomat in Residence at the Asia Society Policy Institute in New York.

Diplomatic career

Daniel Russel served as Assistant Secretary of State for East Asian and Pacific Affairs and is a career member of the Senior Foreign Service. Prior to his appointment as Assistant Secretary on July 12, 2013, Russel served at the White House as Special Assistant to the President and National Security Council (NSC) Senior Director for Asian Affairs. During his tenure there, he helped formulate President Barack Obama's strategic rebalance to the Asia Pacific Region, including efforts to strengthen alliances, deepen U.S. engagement with multilateral organizations, and expand cooperation with emerging powers in the region.

Prior to joining the NSC in January 2009, he served as Director of the Office of Japanese Affairs and had assignments as U.S. Consul General in Osaka-Kobe, Japan (2005-2008); Deputy Chief of Mission at the U.S. Embassy in The Hague, Netherlands (2002-2005); Deputy Chief of Mission at the U.S. Embassy in Nicosia, Cyprus (1999-2002); Chief of Staff to the Under Secretary of State for Political Affairs, Ambassador Thomas R. Pickering (1997–99); Special Assistant to the Under Secretary of State for Political Affairs (1995–96); Political Section Unit Chief at U.S. Embassy Seoul, Republic of Korea (1992–95); Political Advisor to the Permanent Representative to the U.S. Mission to the United Nations, Ambassador Pickering (1989–92); Vice Consul in Osaka and Branch Office Manager in Nagoya, Japan (1987–89); and Assistant to the Ambassador to Japan, former Senate Majority Leader Mike Mansfield (1985–87).

In 1996, Russel was awarded the State Department's Una Chapman Cox Fellowship sabbatical and wrote America’s Place in the World, a book published by Georgetown University.

Previous career and education

Before joining the Foreign Service, he was manager for an international firm in New York City.

Russel was educated at Sarah Lawrence College and University College, University of London, UK.

He is from New Rochelle, New York.

References

External links
State Department biography

1953 births
American diplomats
Living people
Obama administration personnel
United States Foreign Service personnel
Sarah Lawrence College alumni
Alumni of University College London
Assistant Secretaries of State for East Asian and Pacific Affairs